Necrobia violacea is a species of beetle in family Cleridae. It is found in the Palearctic   
 
The imagines occur everywhere, where remnants of carrion can be found. The species prefers dry bones, fur with meat remnants or dried carrion as well as dry fish. It is not infrequent to find them feeding on leather, smoked meat and bacon. The beetle is also regularly found in forensic studies of older bodies. In studies in Switzerland, the imagines appeared during the fourth stage of the body decomposition (ammoniacal decay) and were to be found until the carcasses had dried completely. This corresponds to a period of five to nine months after death, so the presence of the beetle on a carcass usually has little significance for forensic entomology. A period of 25 to 35 days is assumed for the development period of the beetle larvae. In contrast to Necrobia rufipes, the larvae do not eat the carrion, but feed on insect larvae that develop in the carcass and in fleshy products. They are therefore useful and can not be classified as pests. According to other observations, they have the same food preferences as the fly Piophila casei and can also feed on the decomposition products of animal tissues themselves. In laboratory tests, it was shown that the larvae feed inside the pupae of flies of the genus Sarcophaga.

References

Cleridae
Beetles described in 1758
Taxa named by Carl Linnaeus